In enzymology, a beta-glucoside kinase is an enzyme that catalyzes the chemical reaction

ATP + cellobiose  ADP + 6-phospho-beta-D-glucosyl-(1,4)-D-glucose

Thus, the two substrates of this enzyme are ATP and cellobiose, whereas its two products are ADP and 6-phospho-beta-D-glucosyl-(1,4)-D-glucose.

This enzyme belongs to the family of transferases, specifically those transferring phosphorus-containing groups (phosphotransferases) with an alcohol group as acceptor.  The systematic name of this enzyme class is ATP:cellobiose 6-phosphotransferase. This enzyme is also called beta-D-glucoside kinase (phosphorylating).

References

 

EC 2.7.1
Enzymes of unknown structure